Sinești is a commune in Ungheni District, Moldova. It is composed of two villages, Pojarna and Sinești.

References

Communes of Ungheni District